Ruby Ring is a 2013 South Korean television daily drama series starring Lee So-yeon, Im Jung-eun, Kim Suk-hoon and Park Gwang-hyun. It airs on KBS2 on Mondays to Fridays at 19:45 for 93 episodes beginning August 19, 2013.

Plot
Ruby and Runa are twins, although one, unbeknownst to both, was adopted, and are one the opposite of the other: Ruby is responsible, obedient and kind, while Runa is manipulative, selfish and greedy. When Ruby announces her engagement to Bae Kyung-min, the jealousy Runa harbors for her sister sharpens: it has always been her dream to marry a rich man, but instead she remained pregnant with her boyfriend Na In-soo. Soon after, the two sisters have a car accident which disfigures them. Since Ruby's engagement ring and clothes are found on Runa, doctors reconstruct their faces swapping them. Runa has now the opportunity to live as Ruby, who, when she wakes up from a coma and discovers what her sister is doing and that In-soo, while knowing the truth, is not going to do anything, plans revenge.

Cast

Main characters
Lee So-yeon as the real Jung Ruby/Jung Runa
Im Jung-eun as the real Jung Runa/Jung Ruby
Kim Suk-hoon as Bae Kyung-min, Ruby's husband
Park Gwang-hyun as Na In-soo, Runa's fiancé

Supporting characters
Jung Ae-ri as Yoo Gil-ja, Ruby and Runa's mother
Byun Jung-soo as Jung Cho-rim, Gil-ja's sister-in-law
Jung Dong-hwan as Bae Chang-geun, Kyung-min's father
Kim Seo-ra as Park Kyung-sook, Kyung-min's mother
Kim Ga-yeon as Bae Se-ra, Kyung-min's sister
Kim Young-ok as Jo Il-soon, Kyung-min's grandmother
Ha Joo-hee as Seo Jin-hee, an office worker
Lee Hyo-young as Hwang Seok-ho, an office worker
Kim Gyeo-wool as Song Hye-ryun, an office worker
Lee Hyun-woo as Noh Dong-pal, restaurant worker and Cho-rim's boyfriend
Park Jin-joo as Go So-young, restaurant worker
Han Kyung-sun as Jang Geum-hee, Kyung-min's housekeeper
Bae Jung-ah as Lee Eun-ji, Ruby and Runa's friend

Awards and nominations

International broadcast

Adaptations

A Ukrainian adaptation titled  has been produced by Front Cinema Production and aired on Ukraina between 2 January and 25 May 2018. The Ukrainian version has also been broadcast in 2022 by Polish channel TV4.

An Indonesian adaptation of the series called Bawang Putih Berkulit Merah. It began airing on ANTV from 14 January 2020.

References

External links
  
 
 

Korean Broadcasting System television dramas
2013 South Korean television series debuts
2014 South Korean television series endings
Korean-language television shows
South Korean romance television series
South Korean melodrama television series